Rhee may refer to:

 Rhee, Netherlands

People
 A common Korean surname, Lee, which is also commonly transliterated as Rhee or Yi. No relation to the Chinese surname. 
 Several people bearing the Korean surname, as noted at List of people with the Korean family name Lee

Given name
 Rhee Timbang, Filipino cleric and 13th Supreme Bishop of the Philippine Independent Church

Surname
 Margaret Rhee, American feminist poet 
 Michelle Rhee (born 1969), American educator and former Chancellor of the District of Columbia school system
 Peter M. Rhee (born 1961), American physician and US Navy veteran
 Phillip Rhee (born 1960), South Korean-American actor and martial-arts master
 Syngman Rhee (1875–1965), South Korean President

See also

 Master Rhee (disambiguation)
 Rhee Brothers (disambiguation)
 
 Re (disambiguation)
 Ree (disambiguation)
 Rhees (disambiguation)